Xıl (also, Khyl) is a village and municipality in the Masally Rayon of Azerbaijan.  It has a population of 3,848.

Notable natives 

 Elshad Huseynov — National Hero of Azerbaijan.

References 

Populated places in Masally District